William Whitehouse Collins (4 September 1853 – 12 April 1923) was a New Zealand Member of Parliament for Christchurch in the South Island.

Early life

Collins was born on 4 September 1853 in Harborne, Staffordshire, England and came to New Zealand in 1890. He married Alice Annie Skinner, a daughter of Ehenezer Skinner of Sydney, in 1886.

Member of Parliament

Collins represented the City of Christchurch electorate in the House of Representatives from 1893 to 1896 and again between 1899 and 1902. He also stood in the 1896 election, but was narrowly defeated.

He was a rationalist (free-thought) lecturer and was involved with the English Secularists and obtained a diploma from the National Secular Society.

The Canterbury Freethought Association was established in Christchurch in 1881 and ran until 1917. Collins left for Sydney in 1918 and died there on 12 April 1923.

References

Further reading

Works by Collins

Works about Collins

This document is held within the Canterbury Museum Documentary Research Centre, Christchurch.

1853 births
1923 deaths
English emigrants to New Zealand
Independent MPs of New Zealand
New Zealand educators
New Zealand journalists
New Zealand Liberal Party MPs
People from Birmingham, West Midlands
Unsuccessful candidates in the 1896 New Zealand general election
Members of the New Zealand House of Representatives
New Zealand MPs for Christchurch electorates
19th-century New Zealand politicians